Il était une fois... is the third studio album by French rapper Black M, released on 13 September 2019. It consists of 17 tracks including 9 featurings with Bigflo & Oli, Heuss l'Enfoiré, Soolking, PLK, Koba LaD and Niro.

Genesis 
In September 2018, Black M announced on social networks that he was preparing his third album, which should be released in September 2019 and be accompanied by a tour. He released the first single from this future album on 3 June 2019 which is called Bon (Prologue). On 13 September 2019, three years after the release of his previous album, Black M released his third studio album, Il était une fois...

Rception

Commercial reception 
During its first week of operation, the disc sold only 5,600 copies, reaching 9,000 sales at the end of the third week. A disappointing performance for the artist in view of the sales of his previous albums. Despite good promotion and several appearances on television, the record was a real commercial failure.

Track listing

Charts

References

2016 albums
Black M albums